Li Gun is a fictional character in Water Margin, one of the Four Great Classical Novels of Chinese literature. Nicknamed "Sky Soaring Great Sage", he ranks 65th among the 108 Stars of Destiny and 29th among the 72 Earthly Fiends.

Background
Li Gun fights with a sword and a shield whose front is carved with a beast head. He also carries 24 short javelins which he could throw with accuracy. Because he is a versatile warrior, Li Gun is nicknamed "Sky Soaring Great Sage" after the omnipotent Monkey King in Chinese folk lore. He and Xiang Chong are sidekicks of Fan Rui, who leads a 3,000-strong outlaw band at Mount Mangdang (芒碭山; north of present-day Yongcheng, Henan).

Joining Liangshan
The three chiefs of Mount Mangdang have been boasting about wiping out the Liangshan stronghold. Their brag angers Liangshan, which sends Shi Jin to subdue them. But Shi could not hold up against the assault of Xiang Chong and Li Gun, who bear down on his men with speed and ferocity, causing heavy casualties.  Song Jiang arrives with reinforcement. 

The following day, when both sides face off again, Gongsun Sheng arrays the Liangshan troops in the pattern of the Eight Trigrams Formation. Fan Rui, who knows sorcery, assists Xiang Chong and Li Gun in their attack by unsettling the other side with blasting winds and flying pebbles. But Gongsun engulfs Xiang and Li in darkness, trapping them in the formation and driving them into a pit. Meanwhile, Song Jiang's force swarms forward, beating Fan back to his base.

Song Jiang treats the two captives with respect and convinces them to join Liangshan. The two return to Mount Mangdang and successfully help to recruit Fan Rui.

Campaigns and death
Li Gun is appointed as one of the leaders of the Liangshan infantry after the 108 Stars of Destiny came together in what is called the Grand Assembly. He participates in the campaigns against the Liao invaders and rebel forces in Song territory following amnesty from Emperor Huizong for Liangshan.

In the attack on Muzhou (睦州; in present-day Hangzhou, Zhejiang) in the campaign against Fang La, Xiang Chong and Li Gun encounter the enemy general Zheng Biao. After Zheng slayed Xiang, Li Gun pursues him, determined to avenge his comrade. However, he accidentally falls into a stream and is fatally shot by Zheng's archers.

References
 
 
 
 
 
 
 

72 Earthly Fiends
Fictional characters from Jiangsu